Lennard Kämna (born 9 September 1996) is a German professional road racing cyclist, who currently rides for UCI WorldTeam .

Career

At the age of 14, Kämna left his family home in Bremen to attend a sports school in Cottbus. In 2014, he became the junior world champion in the individual time trial at the UCI Road World Championships, having already won the German and European championships at the same level earlier in the year.

A year later, he finished third in the under-23 time trial at the World Championships in Richmond. His effort was impeded by strong winds and light rain, a fact that benefited first and second placed Mads Würtz Schmidt and Maximilian Schachmann, who both started earlier in the day. In June 2015, he also became the German under-23 champion in the time trial. In his first year as a professional, he won the German under-23 Bundesliga and became German mountain champion (Deutsche Bergmeisterschaften). On 14 September 2016, Kämna won the gold medal in the under-23 time trial event at the European Road Championships in Plumelec, France.

He was named in the startlist for the 2017 Vuelta a España, and completed 17 stages of the race. At the 2017 UCI Road World Championships, Kämna was part of the  squad that took the gold medal in the men's team time trial competition, and went on to claim the silver medal in the under-23 road race behind Benoît Cosnefroy. In June 2018 Sunweb announced that Kämna would take a break from cycle racing "reflect on his long-term career goals", having not raced since Milan-San Remo earlier that year due to illness. In July 2019, he was named in the startlist for the 2019 Tour de France.

Kämna took his first senior individual race win at the 2020 Critérium du Dauphiné, where he won the fourth stage. Shortly afterwards he rode the 2020 Tour de France, where he took his first Grand Tour stage win on stage 16 of the race, attacking a reducing lead group on the penultimate climb and being joined by Richard Carapaz, and subsequently countering an attack by Carapaz and building up a lead on the descent and the last climb to win by one and a half minutes. He had previously narrowly missed out on the win on the thirteenth stage of the race, losing out in the final sprint to Daniel Martínez at the summit finish on Puy Mary.

Major results

2014
 1st  Time trial, UCI Junior Road World Championships
 1st  Time trial, UEC European Junior Road Championships
 1st  Time trial, National Junior Road Championships
 1st  National Junior Hillclimb Championships
 1st  Overall Grand Prix Rüebliland
1st Stage 1
 3rd Overall Trofeo Karlsberg
1st Stage 2b (ITT)
2015
 1st  Time trial, National Under-23 Road Championships
 1st Stage 4 Giro della Valle d'Aosta Mont Blanc
 UCI Under-23 Road World Championships
3rd  Time trial
10th Road race
 6th Overall Course de la Paix Under-23
 9th Giro del Belvedere
2016
 1st  Time trial, UEC European Under-23 Road Championships
 4th Time trial, UCI Under-23 Road World Championships
 6th Overall Circuit des Ardennes
1st  Young rider classification
2017
 UCI Road World Championships
1st  Team time trial
2nd  Under-23 road race
 5th Overall Tour des Fjords
2020
 1st Stage 16 Tour de France
 3rd Overall Vuelta a Murcia
 4th Pollença–Andratx
 7th Overall Volta ao Algarve
 8th Overall Critérium du Dauphiné
1st Stage 4
2021
 1st Stage 5 Volta a Catalunya
2022
 1st  Time trial, National Road Championships
 Giro d'Italia
1st Stage 4
Held  after Stages 4–6
 1st Stage 3 Tour of the Alps
 1st Stage 5 Vuelta a Andalucía
 4th Faun-Ardèche Classic
 4th Clásica Jaén Paraíso Interior
2023
 4th Overall Tirreno–Adriatico

Grand Tour general classification results timeline

References

External links

 
 
 
 
 

1996 births
Living people
German male cyclists
People from Wedel
German Tour de France stage winners
German Giro d'Italia stage winners
Cyclists from Schleswig-Holstein